Aiman Udas was a singer and songwriter in Peshawar, Pakistan. Udas had frequently performed on PTV television and AVT Khyber a private pashto channel in Pakistan.

Her first song that she performed was Zma da mene na toba da bya ba nakon mena (in the Pashto language.)

She won considerable acclaim for her songs but had become a musician in the face of bitter opposition from her family, who believed it was sinful for a woman to perform on television. In 2009, ashamed of her growing popularity, her two brothers are reported to have entered her flat while her husband (who is believed to be her 2nd husband) was out and fired three bullets into her chest, killing her. Neither has been caught.

Her final song was titled, “I died but still live among the living, because I live on in the dreams of my lover.”

See also
 Honour killing in Pakistan
 2012 Kohistan video case
 Qandeel Baloch
 Stoning of Farzana Parveen
 Samia Sarwar
 Death of Samia Shahid

References 

Year of birth missing
2009 deaths
Pakistani women singers
People from Peshawar
Pashto-language singers
Pashtun people
Honour killing in Pakistan
Honor killing victims
Murder in Pakistan
Sororicides
Deaths by firearm in Khyber Pakhtunkhwa
Violence against women in Pakistan